Maan (English: Honour) is an Indian soap opera television series produced by Sphere Origins that aired on Metro and Metro Gold from 2001 to 2002. The show is a family drama centered around a Punjabi family – the Maans – in Mumbai. The show was written by Pawan K Sethhi and Satyam Tripathi.

Plot 
Daarji, the family patriarch, runs a business with his three sons. He lives in a house in Mumbai with his sons and their families. He had one more son, who died, and his widow, Amrit lives with them. His sister Bi Ji, played by Suhasini Mulay, also lived with the family.

Cast 
 Unknown as Daarji
 Suhasini Mulay as Biji 
 Salim Shah as Roshan Maan (Khushi's father)
 Sadhana Singh as Ginny's mother
 Sadiya Siddiqui as Ginni/ Gunwant Kaur Maan
 Sanjeet Bedi as Kuldeep Singh Maan
  Rituraj Singh as Kanwaljeet Singh Maan
 Achint Kaur as Sanjana Maan
 Shruti Seth as Khushi/ Khuswant Kaur Maan
 Kanchan Mirchandani as Amrit Maan
 Aditi Pratap as Sahiba

References 

2001 Indian television series debuts
2002 Indian television series endings
DD Metro original programming
Metro Gold original programming
Indian drama television series